Hjälstaby is a village in Enköping Municipality, Uppsala County, Sweden.

References

Populated places in Uppsala County
Populated places in Enköping Municipality